Jeffrey W. Castelli is a CIA officer who served as CIA station chief in Rome at the time of the Niger uranium forgeries. His subsequent involvement in the CIA-led kidnapping of Hassan Mustafa Osama Nasr would lead to his subsequent sentencing to seven years in prison, by an Italian court, in 2013.

Convicted to seven years in prison in the Imam Rapito affair 

Castelli was CIA station chief in Rome at the time of the kidnapping of Egyptian cleric Hassan Mustafa Osama Nasr on February 17, 2003, and was among 26 U.S. nationals (and one of the few with confirmed identities) subsequently indicted by Italian authorities for their involvement in what in the Italian press is referred to as the Imam Rapito (or "kidnapped cleric") affair.

On February 4, 2013, Castelli was convicted to seven years in prison, by a Milan court., along with three other CIA officials. None of the convicted US officials were present at the trial and none of them have been extradited to Italy later.

See also 
 Extraordinary rendition by the United States

External links 
Jeff Castelli at CooperativeResearch

Further reading 
 Kunhanandan Nair, Berlin "Devil and His Dart: How the CIA is Plotting in the Third World" Sterling Publishers, New Delhi, 1986 (117)
 Barton Gellman, "A Leak, then a Deluge", The Washington Post, October 25, 2005

References 

People of the Central Intelligence Agency
Living people
Year of birth missing (living people)